Gymnothorax porphyreus is a moray eel found in the south Pacific ocean. It was first named by Guichenot in 1848, and is commonly known as the lowfin moray.

References

porphyreus
Fish described in 1848